A Single Woman is a play based on the life of Jeannette Rankin, the first woman in the United States Congress. First drafted as a one-woman show by Nevada Shakespeare Company founding Artistic Director, Jeanmarie Simpson, it developed into a "duet performance work" by the time it premiered at the Oats Park Art Center in Fallon, Nevada on February 7, 2004.

The play subsequently toured internationally with hundreds of grassroots including a 4-week run at The Culture Project Off-Broadway in the summer of 2005. The play closed at the Invisible Theatre in Tucson, Arizona on November 5, 2006.

Artists 
In addition to being a theatre artist, Simpson, the author and performer of the title role, is a peace activist. Many performances of the play have been fundraisers for individual branches and the national office of the Women's International League for Peace and Freedom (WILPF), in addition to hundreds of other peace and justice organizations including United Methodist Church's Social Justice and Global Ministries, Jews for Peace, Planned Parenthood, American Civil Liberties Union, Veterans for Peace, American Friends Service Committee and many others. A Single Woman was also produced by the Tennessee Women's Theater Project as their inaugural production.

Cameron Crain, who created the role of 'Everyman' in the play, also directed the production that toured the United States. Simpson directed the production in New York, initially with Claudia Schneider and Les Misérables veteran, Neal Mayer, in the roles. Midway through, Simpson stepped in and completed the run as Rankin.

See also 
 Jeannette Rankin
 Jane Addams
 Raging Grannies
 A Single Woman (film)

References

External links 
 Sacramento News and Review Hudson Review
 Sacramento News and Review Feature 1
 Reno News and Review Feature
 Reno News and Review Jesch Review
Interview for PR Log

American plays adapted into films
Plays based on actual events
2004 plays
Jeannette Rankin